Alexander Anatolievich Petrenko (alternative spelling: Alexandre; 4 February 1976 – 21 July 2006) was a Russian professional basketball player. He was born in Almaty, Kazakh SSR, and held Russian citizenship.

Professional career
Petrenko played professional basketball with Khimki Moscow Region, in the Russian Championship. He was named the Russian League Player of the Year in 2006.

National team career
Petrenko was a member of the senior Russian national basketball team. He played at the 1999 EuroBasket.

Death
Petrenko died in a car crash near Samara, Russia, on 21 July 2006.

References

External links
Euroleague.net Profile
FIBA Archive Profile
FIBA Europe Profile
The Alexander Petrenko Memorial

1976 births
2006 deaths
BC Arsenal Tula players
BC Khimki players
BC Samara players
BC UNICS players
PBC CSKA Moscow players
Power forwards (basketball)
Road incident deaths in Russia
Russian men's basketball players